Wendy Weir (12 November 1948 – 28 November 2020) was an Australian cricketer. Weir played two Tests and one one day international for the Australia national women's cricket team between 1973 and 1979.

References

External links

 Wendy Weir at CricketArchive
 Wendy Weir at southernstars.org.au

1948 births
2020 deaths
Australia women Test cricketers
Australia women One Day International cricketers